Zhang Yuansu 张亓素 (a.k.a. Zhang Jiegu; ca. 1151–1234) was one of the most historically influential Traditional Chinese medicine physicians in the period of transition from China's northern Jin dynasty to the Mongolian Yuan dynasty.

Zhang Jiegu integrated medicinal materials into the five element framework (Wuxing) with both the five shen herbs (spirit herbs) framework and qi meridians. He helped to more clearly define the association of the "tastes" of medicinals and their believed effect on the different organ systems. Zhang asserted that herbs entered into and influenced the meridians. The culmination of Zhang's work was a book called Bag of Pearls (Zhenzhu Nang 珍珠囊).

According to Zhang Jiegu:

References

1150s births
1234 deaths
Jin dynasty (1115–1234) writers
13th-century Chinese physicians
Writers from Baoding
Physicians from Hebei          
Chinese non-fiction writers
12th-century Chinese physicians